Mouloud Moudakkar (born 5 March 1972) is a Moroccan former footballer. He competed in the 1992 Summer Olympics.

References

External links
 
 
 

1972 births
Living people
Moroccan footballers
Morocco international footballers
Olympic footballers of Morocco
Footballers at the 1992 Summer Olympics
Place of birth missing (living people)
Association football midfielders
Mediterranean Games bronze medalists for Morocco
Mediterranean Games medalists in football
Competitors at the 1991 Mediterranean Games
Union Sidi Kacem players
Ittihad Tanger players
Maghreb de Fès players
COD Meknès players
Al-Rayyan SC players
Sakaryaspor footballers
Al-Shaab CSC players
Fujairah FC players
Ittihad Khemisset players
Kuwait SC players
Moroccan expatriate footballers
Expatriate footballers in Qatar
Expatriate footballers in Turkey
Expatriate footballers in the United Arab Emirates
Expatriate footballers in Kuwait